Toon is a Dutch masculine given name that is a diminutive form of Antonie used in Belgium, Netherlands, South Africa, Namibia, Indonesia and Suriname. Notable people with the name include the following:

Given name 
Toon Aerts (born 1993), Belgian cyclist
 Toon de Ruiter (1935 – 2001),  Dutch rower
 Toon Greebe (born 1988), Dutch darts player
 Toon Hiranyasap (born 1954), Thai film actor
 Toon Lenaerts (born 1990), Belgian footballer
 Toon Meerman (born 1933), retired Dutch footballer
 Toon van Driel (born 1945), Dutch cartoonist
Toon van Welsenes (1903 – 1974), Dutch athlete

Nickname
 Toon Becx, nickname of Antonius Wilhelmus Maria Becx (1920 − 2013), Dutch footballer
 Toon Dupuis, nickname of Antonius Stanislaus Nicolaas Ludovicus Dupuis, (1877–1937), Dutch sculptor and medallist of Belgian origin
 Toon Ebben, nickname of Antonius Ebben, who is known as Anton Ebben (22 December 1930 – 4 February 2011), Dutch equestrian
 Toon Geurts, nickname of Antonius Geurts (1932 – 2017), Dutch canoer
 Toon Hermans, nickname of Antoine Gerard Theodore Hermans, (1916–2000), Dutch comedian, singer and writer
 Toon Oprinsen, nickname of Antonius Adrianus Henricus Oprinsen, (1910–1945), Dutch football midfielder
 Toon Pastor, nickname of Antonius Franciscus Pastor, (born 1929), Dutch boxer
 Toon Tellegen, nickname of Antonius Otto Hermannus Tellegen (born 1941), Dutch writer, poet, and physician, known for his children's works
Toon Verhoef, nickname of Anthonie Wilhelmus Verhoef (born 1946), Dutch artist
 Toon van Helfteren, nickname of Anton van Helfteren (born 1951), Dutch basketball player and coach

Surname 
 Al Toon (born 1963), American football player
 Colin Toon (born 1940), English footballer
 Francine Toon (born 1986), British writer
 James Toon (cricketer) (1916–1987), English cricketer
 James Toon (American football) (1938 – 2011), American gridiron football player and coach
 Joseph Toon (1879–1950), English cricketer
 Malcolm Toon (1916–2009), American diplomat
 Maurice Toon, New Zealand paralympic boccia player
 Michael Toon (born 1979), Australian rowing coxswain
 Michael Simon Toon (born 1977), English filmmaker and builder
 Nick Toon (born 1988), American football wide receiver
 Owen Toon (born 1947), American professor of atmospheric and oceanic sciences
 Paige Toon (born 1975), English romantic fiction writer
 Peter Toon (1939–2009), English Anglican priest
 Thomas F. Toon (1840–1902), Confederate States Army brigadier general

See also

Thon (name)
Ton (given name)
Ton (surname)
Tono (name)
Took, surname
Toom (surname)
Toos (given name)

Notes

Dutch masculine given names
Lists of people by nickname